Surakit Rukpanich (born 1932) is a Thai basketball player. He competed in the men's tournament at the 1956 Summer Olympics.

References

1932 births
Living people
Surakit Rukpanich
Surakit Rukpanich
Basketball players at the 1956 Summer Olympics
Place of birth missing (living people)